Comuta may refer to:
Ford Comuta
Comuta-Car or Comuta-Van, variants on the Citicar

See also
Zygostates comuta, a species of orchid in the genus Zygostates